Morgan Harper is a New Zealand professional rugby league footballer who plays as a  for the Manly-Warringah Sea Eagles in the National Rugby League (NRL).

He previously played for the Canterbury-Bankstown Bulldogs in the NRL.

Background
Harper was born in Hamilton, New Zealand. Harper is of Māori (Ngāti Maniapoto mother) and (Ngāti Tūwharetoa father) and Irish descent.

He played his junior rugby league for the Ngaruawahia Panthers in the Waikato Rugby League.

Career
Harper made his NRL debut for Canterbury-Bankstown against the Brisbane Broncos in round 25 of the 2019 NRL season.
In round 17 of the 2020 NRL season, Harper scored two tries for Manly-Warringah in a 34–32 defeat against the Wests Tigers at Brookvale Oval.
In round 19 of the 2021 NRL season, he scored a hat-trick for Manly in their 44–24 victory over the Wests Tigers.
Harper played a total of 18 games for Manly in the 2022 NRL season scoring four tries as the club finished 11th on the table and missed out on the finals.

References

External links
Sea Eagles profile

1998 births
Living people
Canterbury-Bankstown Bulldogs players
New Zealand people of Irish descent
New Zealand Māori rugby league team players
New Zealand rugby league players
Rugby league centres
Rugby league players from Hamilton, New Zealand
Manly Warringah Sea Eagles players